Hermann Emil Fichter (March 30, 1845 – August 5, 1912) was an American soldier in the U.S. Army who served with the 3rd U.S. Cavalry during the Apache Wars. He was one of five men received the Medal of Honor for gallantry battling the Apache Indians in the Whetstone Mountains of Arizona on May 5, 1871.

Biography
Hermann Emil Fichter was born in the Grand Duchy of Baden, Germany on March 30, 1845. He emigrated to the United States and enlisted in the U.S. Army in New York City, New York. He was assigned to frontier duty in the Arizona Territory with the 3rd U.S. Cavalry and took part in the Apache Wars. On May 5, 1871, Fichter was cited for "gallantry in action" while fighting the Apache in the Whetstone Mountains. He was one of five members of his regiment, including Sergeant John Mott, Private John Kilmartin, Private Daniel H. Miller and Private John P. Yount, to receive the Medal of Honor at the end of the year. After leaving the army, Fichter settled in Quincy, Illinois and died there on August 5, 1912, at the age of 67. He was interred at Saint Boniface Cemetery.

Medal of Honor citation
Rank and organization: Private, Company F, 3d U.S. Cavalry. Place and date: At Whetstone Mountains, Ariz., May 5, 1871. Entered service at: ------. Birth: Germany. Date of issue: November 13, 1871.

Citation:

Gallantry in action.

See also

List of Medal of Honor recipients for the Indian Wars

References

Further reading
Konstantin, Phil. This Day in North American Indian History: Important Dates in the History of North America's Native Peoples for Every Calendar Day. New York: Da Capo Press, 2002.

External links

1845 births
1912 deaths
People from the Grand Duchy of Baden
American military personnel of the Indian Wars
United States Army Medal of Honor recipients
United States Army soldiers
German-born Medal of Honor recipients
German emigrants to the United States
People from Quincy, Illinois
American Indian Wars recipients of the Medal of Honor